The 1986 Campeonato Brasileiro Série A was the 30th edition of the Campeonato Brasileiro Série A. São Paulo won the championship.

Overview and format
The 1986 tournament ranks as one of the most controversial ever, alongside 1987. For its detractors, it apparently revived old devils from late 1970s by featuring back a single division with 80 teams, allegedly for political reasons as CBF sought support from smaller teams against growing criticism of the top traditional clubs. These in turn saw this as weaker revenue possibilities, exemplified by 1985 final play-offs, combined with real increased competitiveness from these smaller provincial clubs, now also at national league level. Promotion and relegation were still taboo, and unthinkable for top tier teams. But CBF introduced for the first time this feature (which actually justified the single division formula once for all in order to level the playing field for next-year tournament with more conventional divisions of 24 teams).

First phase (Groups A, B, C & D) 80 teams divided into eight groups. In practice the first four groups constituted a top-tier division featuring 19 teams chosen by their historical ranking records, the 22 champions of 1985 state championships, the two finalists of 1985 and the champion of the 1985 Série B (Tuna Luso). Those would be divided into 4 groups of eleven teams, in which the seven best teams on each group and the four best non-qualified teams, regardless of group, would qualify to the second phase.

First phase (Groups E, F, G & H) In July 1986, when CBF announced the dispute of Parallel Tournament, only 24 clubs would take part. Twenty-two of these clubs would be selected by FA through 1986 state championship record. The others two were Goytacaz, runner-up of 1985 Taça de Prata, and Brasil de Pelotas, the second-best-placed team in the final standings among the teams from groups C and D in the 1985 Taça de Ouro. Through August, some FAs started to pressure for more berths. FFERJ chose Americano to represent the state, instead of Campo Grande, claiming that the 1985 Campeonato Carioca rules gave to the former a berth in 1986 and Campo Grande would have the same right in 1987 (what never happened). Campo Grande protested, threatening to take the matter to court. This situation led to an extension of participants in Parallel Tournament. CBF included other 12 clubs. Ironically, Rio de Janeiro didn't receive an additional berth and Campo Grande did not participate. Under the new rules, the 36 teams would be divided into 4 groups of nine teams, in which only the first-placed team qualified to the second phase.

Second phase Originally, it would have comprised the 24 qualified teams in each group, the four best non-qualified teams and the four group champions of Groups E, F, G and H, giving a total of 32. Those 32 teams would be divided into four groups of 8, in which the two bottom teams would be relegated to the 1987 Série B and the four top-placed teams would qualify to the round of 16. the qualified teams, along with the two other eliminated teams, would participate in the 1987 Série A. However, Vasco da Gama, after being eliminated in the first phase, attempted to get Joinville's berth in the second phase, since Joinville had won the points of a draw against Sergipe due to one player of Sergipe having been caught in an anti-doping test. If that extra point was taken from Joinville, Joinville would fall to 8th place in the group, and Vasco would qualify due to having a better goal difference. As an attempted solution, CBF gave berths in the second phase to both Vasco and Joinville, eliminating Portuguesa, that had appealed to the common courts in an unrelated case about ticket sales. After being threatened with the withdrawal of the clubs from São Paulo, CBF reversed its decision and enlarged the second stage to 36 clubs, qualifying Vasco da Gama, Náutico, Santa Cruz and Sobradinho. Because of that, the 1987 championship was enlarged to 28 clubs. Regardless, the new rules still were fundamentally the same, with the seven top teams of each group qualifying for the 1987 Série A, the bottom two teams being relegated and the four top teams qualifying to the Round of 16.

Final phases 16-team double play-offs. In case that two teams ended tied in goal difference after two matches, the team with the best record in the previous phase would qualify.

First phase

Group A

Group B

Group C

Group D

Groups E to H

Second phase

Group I

Group J

Group K

Group L

Round of 16

Quarterfinals

Semifinals

Finals

Final standings

Série A and Série B overall standings

References

Sources
 1986 Campeonato Brasileiro Série A at RSSSF
 RSSSF Brasil

1986
1
Brazil
B